Undersea is an EP by American indie rock band The Antlers, released in 2012 on ANTI- and Transgressive Records.

Track listing

References

2012 EPs
The Antlers (band) EPs
Anti- (record label) albums
Transgressive Records albums